Atlas Machine and Supply, Inc., founded in 1907, is one of the largest heavy-capacity industrial machinery engineering, manufacturing and remanufacturing centers in the United States. The firm also designs and repairs industrial compressed air systems compressors and related equipment, and offers full compressor rebuilding and rental engineering capabilities. The company had 210 employees as of January 2015. The headquarters are in Louisville, Kentucky, highlighted by a 100,000 sq. ft. facility. Additional plants and repair centers are located in Cincinnati, Ohio, Columbus, Ohio, and in Evansville, Indiana. In 2014 Atlas opened its fifth location, in Indianapolis, Indiana.

In 2014 Richard Gimmel III became the fourth generation of his family to lead the company as president when his father, Richard Gimmel, Jr., became chairman. The Gimmel family immigrated from Switzerland to Louisville in the 1870s.

Atlas began operations manufacturing elevators at a small shop in downtown Louisville, and gradually expanded its machine shop and industrial engineering capabilities. Atlas became a Gardner Denver compressor distributor in the 1940s.

The company's manufacturing facilities now focus on the repair, design, and remanufacturing of heavy industrial machinery.

In 2011, Atlas launched a field machining division that mirrors its machine shop capabilities for customers with on-site repair needs.

Atlas added a new Laser Tracking metrology service in 2012 which allows for completing large-scale machining jobs on-site.

The company has been a beneficiary of the movement by U.S. manufacturers toward outsourcing functions that used to be performed internally, e.g., plant equipment maintenance, engineering, and machinery modification, as well as the recent groundswell in reshoring efforts in U.S. manufacturing.

In 2012, Atlas Machine had more than 3,000 industrial customers throughout North America but concentrated in the Midwest and the Ohio Valley.

References

External links
Company website
Gardner Denver website

Industrial supply companies
Manufacturing companies based in Louisville, Kentucky
Gas compressors
1907 establishments in Kentucky
Manufacturing companies established in 1907
American companies established in 1907